Shaukat Aziz (Urdu: شوکت عزیز) may refer to:

Politics 

 Shaukat Aziz Siddiqui (born 1959), Pakistani jurist and former senior Justice of the Islamabad High Court
 Shaukat Aziz (born 1949), 17th prime minister of Pakistan
 Shoukat Aziz (born 1996), Pakistani human rights activist